Dinavar District is a district (bakhsh) in Sahneh County, Kermanshah Province, Iran.

At the 2006 census, its population was 19,973, in 5,042 families, and at the 2012 census, its population was 18,452, in 5,370 families .  The district has one city: Miyan Rahan. The district's name reflects the ancient city of Dinavar, the ruins of which are in the district. The district has three rural districts (dehestan): Dinavar Rural District, Horr Rural District, and Kanduleh Rural District.

According to History of the Caliphs, Muslims controlled this area in 22 Hijri in the ruling period of Omar ibn al-Khattāb.

References 

Sahneh County

Districts of Kermanshah Province